Walter Sittler is an American-German actor, producer, and writer.

Early life 

Sittler was born on December 5, 1952, in Chicago, Illinois. His father Edward Vieth Sittler had been born a United States citizen, but shortly after Germany's September 1, 1939, invasion of Poland had applied for naturalisation as a German citizen, renouncing his United States Citizenship, and had worked for the Reich Ministry of Public Enlightenment and Propaganda, including as an English language commentator broadcasting propaganda intended to weaken the morale of allied personnel during the Second World War. His father had an unsuccessful marriage in the United States before emigrating to Germany, and on September 27, 1940, had re-married to Walter Sittler's mother, Lily Margaret, who had been born in England in 1918 and held British and German citizenship. Sittler's paternal uncle, Charles Veith Sittler, employed by the University of Chicago in 1960, had also broadcast for the Nazis (and had married Klara Julie Karoline Clee Hitterling in Berlin-Steglitz on February 1, 1945). Although he had not renounced his United States citizenship Charles Veith Sittler was neither charged with treason nor stripped of his citizenship. Edward Vieth Sittler and Charles Veith Sittler had been returned separately to the United States by the United States Government after the Second World War as witnesses for the prosecution in the treason trials of other Americans who had worked for the Nazi German government. Edward Vieth Sittler, employed as a university professor, remained in the United States despite his lack of citizenship until deported in 1954. Walter Sittler possesses United States Citizenship on the basis of his own birth in the United States before the deportation. His father later returned to the US (it is unclear whether accompanied by his family or not) and attempted to regain his United States Citizenship, which was rejected by the Courts on April 12, 1963, following which he returned to West Germany, where he died in 1975.

Professional life 
Walter Sittler was an acting student at the Otto-Falckenberg-Schule in Munich, and debuted on the stage in 1981 at the Nationaltheater Mannheim. He went on to act also on television, including playing Dr. Robert Schmidt in the German television show Nikola (1997–2005), and in films such as EuroTrip (2004).

Activism 
Sittler has spoken out against the Stuttgart 21 railway and urban development project, and against populist politics, saying in a 2016 interview:

In the 2016 United States presidential election he voted for Hillary Clinton against Donald Trump (another American-born television personality of German and British ancestry).

Family 
Sittler married to director and writer Sigrid Klausmann on May 29, 1985. They have three children, including actress Jennifer Sittler, Benedikt Sittler, and Lea-Marie Sittler.

Filmography

Actor 
 1987: Die Schwarzwaldklinik (television series, 2 episodes)
 1989: Tatort – Die Neue (television series)
 1993–1994: Stadtklinik (television series, 2 episodes)
 1990: Liebesgeschichten (television series, 1 episode)
 1995–2004: Girl friends – Freundschaft mit Herz (television series, 69 episodes)
 1995: Rosemarie Nitribitt – Tod einer Edelhure
 1996: Mutproben
 1996–2005: Nikola (television series, 9 episodes)
 1997: Life Penalty
 1998: Das Amt (television series)
 1998: SOKO 5113 (television series)
 1999: Rivalinnen der Liebe
 2000: Die Wüstenrose (two-part television film)
 2000: Das Herz des Priesters
 2001: Der Millionär und die Stripperin
 2002: The Gathering Storm (television film)
 2002: Der Templer (short film)
 2003: Für immer verloren
 2004: Der Mustervater – Allein unter Kindern
 2004: Eurotrip
 2004: Die unlösbaren Fälle des Herrn Sand
 2004–2007: Ein Fall für den Fuchs (television series, 6 episodes)
 2005: Adelheid und ihre Mörder (television series)
 2005: Ein Geschenk des Himmels
 2006: Heute heiratet mein Mann
 2007: Reife Leistung
 2006: Trau niemals deinem Schwiegersohn
 2007: Der Mustervater 2
 2007: Der Butler und die Prinzessin
 seit 2007: Der Kommissar und das Meer (television series)
 2009: Das Traumschiff (television series)
 2010: Scheidung für Fortgeschrittene
 2010: Kommissar Stolberg (television series)
 2010: Weihnachten im Morgenland
 2011: Halbe Portionen
 2011: Almanya – Willkommen in Deutschland
 2012: Die Jagd nach dem weißen Gold
 2012: Polizeiruf 110: Fieber
 2013: 
 2013: Der große Schwindel
 2014: Sternstunde ihres Lebens
 2014: Zu mir oder zu dir?
 2015: 600 PS für zwei (television film)
 2015: Alleine war gestern
 2015: Das goldene Ufer
 2015: 
 2015: Ostwind 2 (sequel to Ostwind)
 2016: Viktor (Short film)
 2017: Eltern allein zu Haus (television trilogy)
 2018: Venus im vierten Haus
 2018–2019: Daheim in den Bergen (television series)
 2018: Liebesleid
 2018: Schwesternliebe
 2019: Liebesreigen
 2019: Schuld und Vergebung
 2020: Der Liebhaber meiner Frau
 2020: 
 2020: Unter Freunden stirbt man nicht (television series, 4 episodes)
 2021: Ein Sommer in Antwerpen (television series)

Producer 
 2007: Fliegen wirst du noch! (Documentary)
 2009: Lisette und ihre Kinder (Documentary)
 2010: Thomas Hitzlsperger und die Township Kinder (Documentary)
 2017: Nicht ohne uns! (Documentary)

Voice 
 2010: Thomas Hitzlsperger and the Township Kinder (Documentary)

References

External links

1952 births
Living people
American male film actors
American male television actors
American people of German descent
German male film actors
German male television actors
German people of American descent
Male actors from Chicago
Male actors from Los Angeles
Male actors from Stuttgart
20th-century American male actors
20th-century German male actors
21st-century American male actors
21st-century German male actors